James Kenneth Irving,  (born March 20, 1928) is a Canadian billionaire businessman who is the eldest son of industrialist K.C. Irving. With an estimated net worth of US$6.9 billion (as of 2019), Irving was ranked by Forbes as the 4th richest person in Canada.

Career
After their father's death in 1992, ownership and responsibility for the Irving companies was divided as follows:

 James K. Irving (J.K.) – Ownership of and responsibility for Brunswick News (publishing); and J. D. Irving, Limited,  a conglomerate with interests in several industries including forestry, pulp and paper, tissue, lumber, building supplies, frozen food, transportation, shipping lines, and ship building.
 Arthur Irving (Art) – Ownership  of and responsibility for Irving Oil, its retail stores, oil refineries, oil tankers and distribution terminals and other facilities.
 John E. Irving  (Jack) — Ownership of and responsibility for construction, engineering, and steel fabrication companies. After his death in July 2010 he was succeeded by son John K. F. Irving.

In 1957, he pioneered the company's reforestation and tree improvement programs and expanded the forest products business. In 1996, Irving was made an Officer of the Order of Canada, and in 2008 he became a Member of the Order of New Brunswick and the Canadian Business Hall of Fame. He is occasionally involved in efforts to preserve the Atlantic salmon in northeastern North America. Irving also started the PALS (Partners Assisting Local Schools) program for schoolchildren locally in Saint John N.B. which has spread to have many schools in the province participating over the past 16 years.

Personal life
Irving was married to philanthropist Jean E. Irving until her death in 2019. They had four children, Jim Jr., Robert, Mary Jean and Judy.

References

1928 births
Living people
Canadian billionaires
Businesspeople from New Brunswick
Canadian philanthropists
People from Kings County, New Brunswick
Members of the Order of New Brunswick
Officers of the Order of Canada
20th-century Canadian newspaper publishers (people)
21st-century Canadian newspaper publishers (people)